Arrën is a village and a former municipality in Kukës County, Albania. At the 2015 local government reform it became a subdivision of the municipality Kukës. The population at the 2011 census was 462. The municipal unit consists of the following villages:

 Arrën
 Arrëz
 Barrë
 Vërrij
 Tejmoll

References

Former municipalities in Kukës County
Administrative units of Kukës
Villages in Kukës County